Epalahame Faiva (born 9 May 1994) is a New Zealand-born Italian rugby union player who plays as a hooker. He recently played for Worcester Warriors in Premiership Rugby but had his contracted terminated along with every other Warriors player on 5 October 2022.

Early career
Born and raised in Auckland, Faiva attended Wesley College in the city and while there played for the Eden Rugby Club before later trying out rugby league.   During his time at Wesley College, he also played representative rugby for  before shifting south to  where he was a member of their academy and also played under-20 rugby.

Club career
Faiva made his senior debut for Waikato in a Ranfurly Shield defense against Heartland Championship side Horowhenua-Kapiti in July 2013, aged just 19.   He made his national provincial championship bow later in the year, but that was to be his sole appearance at that level in 2013.   The following year brought more game time as he played 8 times and scored 2 tries as he began to establish himself as the Mooloo's first choice in the number 2 jersey.   He subsequently played all 20 of Waikato's Premiership matches across the 2015 and 2016 seasons, 17 of these appearances came from the start and he also added 2 tries to his career total.

Several seasons of solid performances at provincial level were rewarded when he was named in the Blues squad ahead of the 2017 Super Rugby season.

On 13 November 2017, Fava leaves home to sign for Italy team Benetton in the Pro14 from the 2017–18 season.
He played with Benetton until 2021−2022 season.

International career
Faiva was a member of the New Zealand Under-20 sides which competed in the 2013 and 2014 IRB Junior World Championships.   He scored 4 tries in 8 appearances as the Kiwis finished in 4th and 3rd place respectively.

On the 14 October 2021, he was selected by Alessandro Troncon to be part of an Italy A 28-man squad for the 2021 end-of-year rugby union internationals.

On the 31 October 2021, he was selected by Kieran Crowley to be part of an Italy 34-man squad for the 2021 end-of-year rugby union internationals. On 20 October 2021 Faiva made his debut for Italy, scoring a try in Italy's 17–10 win over Uruguay.

International tries 
As of 20 November 2021

References

External links
It's Rugby England profile

1994 births
Living people
New Zealand rugby union players
Rugby union hookers
Waikato rugby union players
Rugby union players from Auckland
People educated at Wesley College, Auckland
New Zealand sportspeople of Tongan descent
Blues (Super Rugby) players
Benetton Rugby players
Italian rugby union players
Italy international rugby union players